Balakrishna Hari Kolhatkar (September 25, 1926 – June 30, 1994), also known as Bal Kolhatkar, was a Marathi playwright, poet, actor, and director.

References 

1926 births
1994 deaths
Marathi-language writers